Dipsas williamsi, the Williams's tree snake, is a non-venomous snake found in Peru.

References

Dipsas
Snakes of South America]
Reptiles of Peru
Endemic fauna of Peru
Reptiles described in 1974